Plan R 4 was an unrealised British plan to invade Norway and Sweden in April 1940, during the Second World War. As a result of competing plans for Norway and a German invasion of Norway the same month, it was not carried out as designed. Similar plans had been drawn up during the proposed Anglo-French intervention in the Winter War.

Background
Germany did not have a sufficient domestic supply of iron ore, which is used in the production of steel. Before the war, large quantities of iron ore had been imported from mines in the French province of Lorraine. Since September 1939, that supply had no longer been available and so shipments from the other large supplier, Sweden, were essential for the production of tanks, guns, ships, railcars, trucks and other implements of war. 
In the northern part of the Baltic Sea, the Gulf of Bothnia, lies the Swedish port of Luleå from where in the summer a quantity of ore was shipped. It was frozen in winter, so for several months each year the Swedes shipped most of their iron ore by rail through the ice-free port of Narvik, in the far north of Norway. In a normal year, 80% of the iron ore was exported through Narvik. The only alternative in winter was a long rail journey to Oxelösund on the Baltic Sea, south of Stockholm, which was not obstructed by ice. However, British intelligence suggested that Oxelösund could ship only one fifth of the weight Germany required. Travelling inside Norwegian territorial waters for most of the trip the shipping from Narvik was virtually immune to British interception attempts. To Britain, stopping the shipping and thus starving German industry was vitally important.

The Allies devised a plan to use the Soviet Union's 30 November 1939 attack on Finland as a cover for seizing both the Swedish ore fields in the north and the Norwegian harbours through which it was shipped to Germany. The plan was to get Norwegian and Swedish permission to send an expeditionary force to Finland across Sápmi, ostensibly to help the Finns. Once in place, they were to proceed to take control of Swedish harbours and mines, to occupy cities such as Gävle and Luleå and to shut down German access to Swedish ore. That would present Norway and Sweden with a fait accompli.

Because of the danger of Allied or German occupation and of the war being waged on their territory, both the Swedes and the Norwegians refused the transit requests.

Meanwhile, the Germans, having realised the Allied threat, were making plans for a possible pre-emptive invasion of Norway in order to protect their strategic supply lines.  The Altmark Incident of 16 February 1940 convinced Hitler that the Allies would not respect Norwegian neutrality, and he ordered the plans for an invasion hastened.

The Scandinavian reluctance to allow Allied troops on their territory halted the original Allied plan for using aid to Finland as a pretext for moving in troops, but on 12 March the Allies decided to try a "semi-peaceful" invasion nevertheless. Troops were to be landed in Norway, and proceed into Sweden to capture the Swedish mines. However, if serious military resistance was encountered they were not to press the issue. However, Finland sued for peace on 13 March, so the revised version of this plan had to be abandoned too.

The Germans were partly aware of the Allied planning. Intercepted radio traffic showed Allied transport groups had been readied. Later interceptions informed Germany that the Allies had abandoned the plan and redeployed their forces. However, Hitler feared the Allies would launch their invasion sooner or later. As a result, 9 April was set as the date of Operation Weserübung, the German attack on both Denmark and Norway.

The plan 
Britain had two separate but parallel plans: Operation Wilfred and Plan R 4.

Operation Wilfred 
Operation Wilfred, set to commence on 5 April (but delayed to 8 April), was a British naval operation intending to place two mine fields inside Norwegian territorial waters. That would force ships carrying ore into international waters and become vulnerable to the British Royal Navy, which subsequently would be able to prevent the transport of Swedish iron ore to be used to sustain the German war effort. The Norwegian and Swedish governments were to be publicly informed some days beforehand, being accused of inability to uphold their neutrality.

Plan R4 
R 4 consisted of

 Stratford – the main British force (Scots Guards + AA) to occupy the area from Narvik to the Swedish border following the railway
 Avonmouth (combined British and French force) – a raid to destroy the Sola airfield outside Stavanger and occupation of Bergen and Trondheim, the force comprising the main part of 146th and 148th Infantry Brigades plus a French Alpine brigade.
 Plymouth (British force) consisting of the Hallamshire battalion of the 146th Infantry Brigade to land at Trondheim and advance eastwards

According to Ziemke, it was hoped that Operation Wilfred would provoke a German reaction in the form of either troop landings or threats thereof, and R 4 to be executed "the moment the Germans landed in Norway 'or showed they intended to do so,'" with the first battalion transports to sail within a few hours after the mines had been laid. 
Claasen on the other hand states the orders as "it is not intended that any Forces shall be landed in Norway until the Germans have violated Norwegian Territory, or there is clear evidence that they intend to do so." Both agree that the plan assumed the Norwegians would not actively resist the British forces.

Aftermath 
Although Plan R 4 could not be executed as planned, as major elements of the German navy were reported to be present in Norwegian waters, Allied troops were swiftly sent to Norway to fight alongside the Norwegians. Real success was achieved only against the Germans in the Narvik area, bringing them close to surrender. The Allied troops consisted of 24,500 British, Norwegian, French and Polish troops, in particular marine infantry, French Foreign Legionnaires, and Polish mountain troops. The German troops were composed of 2,000 mountain troops and 2,600 seamen from the sunken German invasion flotilla. On 17 April 1940, Hitler ordered the German troops to evacuate to Sweden to be interned (see the Allied campaign in Norway). However, the successful German campaign against France and the Low countries led to an Allied troop re-deployment. Allied troops were evacuated from Narvik by 8 June 1940.

See also
 Franco-British plans for intervention in the Winter War
 Foreign support in the Winter War
 British occupation of the Faroe Islands in World War II
 Iceland during World War II
 Project Catherine

References

Military history of the United Kingdom during World War II
Military operations directly affecting Sweden during World War II
Cancelled invasions
Cancelled military operations of World War II